Anthene marshalli is a butterfly in the family Lycaenidae. It is found in Sierra Leone,  Burkina Faso and Nigeria.

References

Butterflies described in 1903
Anthene
Butterflies of Africa
Taxa named by George Thomas Bethune-Baker